The Squire of Long Hadley is a 1925 British silent drama film directed by Sinclair Hill and starring Marjorie Hume, Brian Aherne and G. H. Mulcaster It was adapted from a novel by E. Newton Bungay and was also known under the alternative title of Romance of Riches.

Premise
A social-climbing businessman becomes a squire of a village.

Cast
 Marjorie Hume as Marjorie Clayton
 Brian Aherne as Jim Luttrell
 G. H. Mulcaster as Ronald Neilson
 Eileen Dennes as Lucy
 Albert E. Raynor as Robert Clayton
 Tom Coventry as Barker
 Mabel Penn as Mrs Mopps
 Margaret Reeve as Liz
 Humberston Wright as Solicitor

References

Bibliography
 Low, Rachael. History of the British Film, 1918-1929. George Allen & Unwin, 1971.

External links

1925 films
British silent feature films
1925 drama films
Films directed by Sinclair Hill
British drama films
Stoll Pictures films
Films shot at Cricklewood Studios
British black-and-white films
1920s English-language films
1920s British films
Silent drama films